The 1987 San Jose State Spartans football team represented San Jose State University during the 1987 NCAA Division I-A football season as a member of the Pacific Coast Athletic Association. The team was led by head coach Claude Gilbert, in his fourth year as head coach at San Jose State. They played home games at Spartan Stadium in San Jose, California. The Spartans finished the 1987 season as champions of the PCAA for the second consecutive season, with a record of ten wins and two losses (10–2, 7–0 PCAA).

As a result of the PCAA Championship, the Spartans qualified for a postseason bowl game against the Mid-American Conference (MAC) champion Eastern Michigan Eagles. The 1987 California Bowl was played in Fresno, California on December 12, with Eastern Michigan winning, 30–27.

Schedule

Team players in the NFL
The following were selected in the 1988 NFL Draft.

The following finished their college career in 1987, were not drafted, but played in the NFL.

Notes

References

San Jose State
San Jose State Spartans football seasons
Big West Conference football champion seasons
San Jose State Spartans football